Experimental College may refer to:

 Free university, a movement for adult education with uncredited classes open to the public
 Experimental College (Tufts University), a college at Tufts University
 Experimental College of the Twin Cities, Minnesota
 University of Wisconsin Experimental College
 Experimental College, at San Francisco State University